is a Japanese theatre and film actor. He is best known for his comedic portrayals.

Biography
Nishimura was born on December 12, 1960 in Toyama, Toyama, Japan. While he attended Toyo University to study photography he met Kōki Mitani, a script writer for radio and playwright who aspired to be an actor and who turned his attention to the theatre.

In 1983, Nishimura, Mitani and others including the actors Zen Kajiwara and Kazuyuki Aijima formed the Tokyo Sunshine Boys, a comedy troupe that grew in popularity over the following ten years.  They produced the popular play 12 Gentle Japanese, a parody of Reginald Rose's 12 Angry Men. When 12 Gentle Japanese was adapted to film, Nishimura did not form part of the cast.

In the 1990s the success of the Tokyo Sunshine Boys brought Nishimura parts in television dramas, notably a part in Furikaereba Yatsuga Iru and as the flamboyant Shintaro Imaizumi in Kōki Mitani's Furuhata Ninzaburo.

With the release of the Kōki Mitani film adaptation of the play Radio no Jikan in 1997, Nishimura won acclaim for his portrayal of a radio producer—a role for which he won the Best Supporting Actor award from the Japanese Academy Awards as well as a Blue Ribbon Award.

The Tokyo Sunshine Boys disbanded in 1998, but most of its actors, including Nishimura, continued to work in television.

Awards
 Elan d'or Award for Newcomer of the Year (1997)
 Best Supporting Actor (Japanese Academy Awards) for Kōki Mitani Radio no Jikan
 Best Supporting Actor (Japanese Academy Award) for Juzo Itami Marutai no Onna
 Popularity Award "Most Popular Performer" for 1997
 Blue Ribbon Awards "Best Supporting Actor"
 Best Supporting Actor at the 22nd Hochi Film Award for Marutai no onna and Welcome Back, Mr. McDonald
 Kinema Junpo Award

Filmography

Films
Tomoko no baai (1996)
Shichi-gatsu nano ka, Hare (1996)
Radio no Jikan: Welcome Back Mr. McDonald (1997)
Princess Mononoke (1997) - Kōroku (voice)
Marutai no onna (1997)
The Black House (1999)
Godzilla 2000 (1999)
O-juken (1999)
GTO (1999)
Kawa no Nagare no Yō ni (2000)
Denen no yuutsu (2001)
Ghiblies: Episode 2 (2002)
Ganryujima (2003) - Sasaki Kojirō
Nin Nin the Movie (2004)
Furyo shonen no yume (2005)
Warai no Daigaku (2006)
Tokyo Family (2013) - Kōichi Hirayama
Samurai Hustle (2014) - Kanetsugu Sōma
The Magnificent Nine (2016)
What a Wonderful Family! (2016)
What a Wonderful Family! 2 (2017)
Linking Love (2017)
What a Wonderful Family! 3: My Wife, My Life (2018)
Iwane: Sword of Serenity (2019)
JK Rock (2019)
Samurai Shifters (2019)
The 47 Ronin in Debt (2019)
Apparel Designer (2020)
Angry Rice Wives (2021)
The Supporting Actors: The Movie (2021) - himself
My Father's Tracks (2021)
Dreaming of the Meridian Arc (2022)
The Hound of the Baskervilles: Sherlock the Movie (2022)
Mado (2022)

Television
Furikaereba Yatsu ga Iru(1993)
Furuhata Ninzaburo  (1994) - Shintaro Imaizumi
Ousama no restoran (1995)
Hideyoshi (1996) - Tokugawa Ieyasu
Otona no otoko (1997)
Sōrito Yobanaide (1997) - Executive Secretary to the Prime Minister
Yamato Nadeshiko (2000)
Yome wa mitsuboshi (2001)
Koi no chikara (2002)
Itsumo futari de (2003)
Kanojo ga shinjatta (2004)
Wonderful Life (2004)
Nodame Cantabile (2006)
The Family (2007)
Sanada Maru (2016) - Muroga Masatake
Kyoaku wa Nemurasenai (2016) - Nobutsuna Nakae
Kirin ga Kuru (2020) - Akechi Mitsuyasu

References

External links
 
 

1960 births
Living people
Japanese male stage actors
People from Toyama (city)
Musicians from Toyama Prefecture